Robert Carrickford (4 January 1928 – 15 March 2016) was an Irish actor and contributor to Irish arts and culture through performances in theatre, film and television.

He played 'Stephen Brennan' in the Irish television series Glenroe. Carrickford was president of Irish Actors Equity during the 1980s and 1990s representing and lobbying for better pay and conditions for Irish actors.

He played several roles at the Abbey Theatre between 1969–80. He died in 2016 at the age of 88.

Filmography

actor

References

External links
 

20th-century Irish male actors
1928 births
2016 deaths
Place of death missing
Irish male stage actors
Irish male television actors
People from Ballyshannon